Hasan Tavanayan Fard (March 25, 1943 - January 21, 2015, Tehran) was an Iranian economist, author and poet.

He wrote more than 40 books in his lifetime in the field of economics, history and literature and wrote many articles.

Education
He completed his Economics degree at Tehran University. He studied Masters in Economics at Swansea University in 1972 and wrote a thesis titled 'U.K. private short term capital movements (1963-1972)'
.

Work
He held several teaching posts such as at the University of Sanate Sharif, Tehran University and Payame Noor University.

In 1986, he established his own publishing company called Far Nashr Publishing, printing books about Chemistry, English, Business Correspondence and Children’s IQ Test.

Some of his books include:

References

Academic staff of the University of Tehran
1943 births
2015 deaths
Academic staff of Payame Noor University